Nationality words link to articles with information on the nation's poetry or literature (for instance, Irish or France).

Events
 July 13 – William Wordsworth's poem Lines composed a few miles above Tintern Abbey on revisiting the banks of the Wye during a tour, 13 July 1798 written. 
 William Wordsworth begins writing the first version of The Prelude, finishing it in two parts in 1799. This version describes the growth of his understanding up to age 17, when he departed for Cambridge University. He would revise the poem more than once during his lifetime but not publish it. Months after his death in 1850 it was published for the first time.

Works published

United Kingdom

 Robert Anderson, Poems on Various Subjects
 William Lisle Bowles, St. Michael's Mount
 George Canning and J. H. Frere, The Loves of the Triangles, a parody of Erasmus Darwin's The Loves of the Plants
 Samuel Taylor Coleridge:
 Fears in Solitude, a small pamphlet including
"Fears in Solitude: Written in April 1798, During the Alarm of an Invasion"
 "France: An Ode", first published as The Recantation: An Ode and later renamed; the poem mark's Coleridge's political turn away from revolutionary France after the French invasion of Switzerland; first published in the April 16 edition of the Morning Post
 "Frost at Midnight"
 See William Wordsworth, below for more information on Lyrical Ballads, a collection of Coleridge's and Wordsworth's poems, including Coleridge's
 "The Rime of the Ancyent Marinere" (title later changed to Rime of the Ancient Mariner in the 1800 edition, in which the author also dropped much of the archaic wording)
 "The Nightingale: A Conversation Poem"
 Joseph Cottle, Malvern Hills
 William Cowper, "On the Receipt of My Mother's Picture"
 Thomas Gisborne, Poems, Sacred and Moral
 Charles Lamb and Charles Lloyd, Blank Verse, including Lamb's "The Old Familiar Faces"
 Richard Polwhele (anonymously), The Unsex'd Females
 Samuel Rogers, An Epistle to a Friend, with Other Poems
 William Sotheby, Oberon, translation from the original German of Christoph Martin Wieland
 William Wordsworth and Samuel Taylor Coleridge, published anonymously, Lyrical Ballads with a Few Other Poems (see Coleridge, above, for more on his contributions to the work; and see also Lyrical Ballads 1801, 1802, 1805 and 1815) including:
 "Lucy Gray"
 "Tintern Abbey"
 "We are Seven"
 The Lucy poems:
 "She dwelt among the untrodden ways"
 "A slumber did my spirit seal"
 "Strange fits of passion have I known"
 "Three years she grew in sun and shower"
 "I travelled among unknown men"

United States

 Richard Alsop, with Lemuel Hopkins and Theodore Dwight, The Political Greenhouse
 Joseph Hopkinson, "Hail Columbia", a popular patriotic song, written during the war fever against France
 William Munford, Poems and Prose on Several Occasions, including a tragedy, translations from Horace, versifications of Ossian
 Judith Sargent Murray, The Gleaner
 Robert Treat Paine, Jr., "Adams and Liberty", the author's most famous work, sung throughout the country; praising America's independence from European tyranny
 Jonathan Mitchell Sewall, Versification of President Washington's Excellent Farewell-Address

Other
 Ivan Kotliarevsky, Eneyida (Енеїда), Ukrainian
 Johann von Goethe, Hermann und Dorothea, Germany

Births
Death years link to the corresponding "[year] in poetry" article:
 January 5 – David Macbeth Moir (died 1851), Scottish
 March 30 – Luise Hensel (died 1876), German
 April 8 – Dionysios Solomos Διονύσιος Σολωμός (died 1857), Greek poet best known for the Hymn to Liberty, the first two stanzas of which become the Greek national anthem
 April 19 – Andrea Maffei (died 1885), Italian poet, translator and librettist
 June 18 – McDonald Clarke (died 1842), American
 June 29 – Count Giacomo Leopardi (died 1837), Italian
 September 20 – Samuel Henry Dickson (died 1872), American poet, physician, writer and educator
 December 24 – Adam Mickiewicz (died 1855), Polish Romantic poet
 c. 1798–1800 – Charles Jeremiah Wells (died 1879), English

Deaths
Birth years link to the corresponding "[year] in poetry" article:
 April 11 – Karl Wilhelm Ramler (born 1724), German poet
 May 28 – Mary Alcock (born 1742), English poet, essayist and philanthropist
 October 14 – Robert Merry (born 1755), English poet and dilettante, died in the United States.
 November 23 – David Samwell, known as Dafydd Ddu Feddyg (born 1751), Welsh naval surgeon and poet
 Also:
 Edmund Gardner (born c. 1752), English
 St. John Honeywood (born 1763), American
 Waris Shah (born 1722), Punjabi Sufi poet

See also

 Poetry
 List of years in poetry
 List of years in literature
 18th century in literature
 18th century in poetry
 Romantic poetry

Notes

Poetry
18th-century poetry